The 1996 Liberty Bowl was a college football bowl game played on December 27, 1996, in Memphis, Tennessee. The 38th edition of the Liberty Bowl, it matched the Houston Cougars and the Syracuse Orangemen.

Background
Syracuse, who had finished as co-champion of the Big East Conference (alongside Virginia Tech and Miami, who went to the Orange and Carquest Bowls, respectively), was invited to play in the Liberty Bowl, their first Liberty Bowl since 1961. This was their fifth bowl game in the decade, and 8th in the past 10 seasons. As for Houston, they had finished as co-champion of Conference USA (along with Southern Miss) in the inaugural year of the conference. This was their first bowl game since 1988.

Game summary
The game found two future first rounders and Super Bowl participants: Syracuse's Donovan McNabb and Houston's Antowain Smith. Although only completing four of ten pass attempts, McNabb rushed for 49 yards and two touchdowns. Smith rushed for 119 yards and a touchdown, as well as receiving for 44 yards and a touchdown. Orangemen running back Malcolm Thomas ran for 201 yards and a touchdown earning MVP honors.

Scoring summary
 Syracuse – Donovan McNabb 1 yard touchdown run (Trout kick) – 13:16 remaining in the 1st quarter
 Houston – Justin Davis 21 yard touchdown pass from Chuck Clements (Villarreal kick) – 11:48 remaining in the 1st quarter
 Syracuse – Rob Konrad 2 yard touchdown run (Trout kick) – 9:02 remaining in the 2nd quarter
 Syracuse – Team safety (snap sailed over the head of punter Ignacio Sauceda, landing in the end zone) – 3:58 remaining in the 2nd quarter
 Houston – Justin Davis 3 yard touchdown run (Villarreal kick) – 0:30 remaining in the 2nd quarter
 Syracuse – Donovan McNabb 2 yard touchdown run (Trout kick) – 13:52 remaining in the 4th quarter
 Houston – Sebastian Villarreal 23 yard field goal – 10:50 remaining in the 4th quarter
 Syracuse – Malcolm Thomas 6 yard touchdown run (Trout kick) – 5:29 remaining in the 4th quarter

Statistics

References

Liberty BOwl
Liberty Bowl
Houston Cougars football bowl games
Syracuse Orange football bowl games
1996 in sports in Tennessee
December 1996 sports events in the United States